Lannea discolor, the live-long, is a plant species in the family Anacardiaceae. It is found from the DRC to Zambia, Zimbabwe, South Africa and Eswatini. It similar in appearance to L. schweinfurthii which has a largely overlapping distribution.

References

External links
 

discolor